Ángel Reinaldo Orué Echeverría (born 5 January 1989) is a Paraguayan footballer. Emerged from Libertad youth ranks, he debuted in 2009 and the following season, was part of the squad that won its fifteenth league title. In mid–2011, after a regular season, he left the Asunción based–club for Santiago Wanderers in Chile, but after another unsuccessful spell, he returned to Paraguay for Nacional.

Honours

Club
Libertad
 Torneo de Clausura (1): 2010

References

External links
 Ángel Orué at Football-Lineups
 
 

1989 births
Living people
Paraguayan footballers
Paraguayan expatriate footballers
Club Libertad footballers
Santiago Wanderers footballers
Club Nacional footballers
12 de Octubre Football Club players
Club Atlético Douglas Haig players
KF Skënderbeu Korçë players
Club Rubio Ñu footballers
Club San José players
Ayacucho FC footballers
General Díaz footballers
Club Atlético 3 de Febrero players
Paraguayan Primera División players
Chilean Primera División players
Kategoria Superiore players
Primera Nacional players
Bolivian Primera División players
Peruvian Primera División players
Sportspeople from Luque
Association football forwards
Expatriate footballers in Chile
Expatriate footballers in Argentina
Expatriate footballers in Peru
Expatriate footballers in Ecuador
Expatriate footballers in Bolivia
Expatriate footballers in Albania
Paraguayan expatriate sportspeople in Chile
Paraguayan expatriate sportspeople in Argentina
Paraguayan expatriate sportspeople in Peru
Paraguayan expatriate sportspeople in Ecuador
Paraguayan expatriate sportspeople in Bolivia
Paraguayan expatriate sportspeople in Albania